The Virgin and Child with Saints Dorothy and George is a c.1516 oil on panel painting by Titian, now in the Prado Museum in Madrid, to which it was transferred in 1839.

It was the first painting by the artist to be acquired by Philip II of Spain, who sent it to the Escorial in 1593. It belongs to the sacra conversazione genre and belongs to a series of portrayals of the Madonna and Child with saints by Titian in the 1510s and 1520s, usually in a horizontal format and intended for private devotion. The model for the figure of Saint Dorothy also appears in several of his half-length allegorical works (Flora and Vanitas for example), possibly the painter's lover.

References

Paintings of Saint George (martyr)
Paintings of Saint Dorothy
Paintings by Titian in the Museo del Prado
Paintings of the Madonna and Child by Titian
1516 paintings